Rope a Dope Style is the fifth studio album by American contemporary R&B group LeVert, released , via Atlantic Records. The album was produced by group members Gerald Levert and Marc Gordon; and it peaked at #122 on the Billboard 200.

Four singles were released from the album: the title track, "Give a Little Love", "All Season" and "Baby I'm Ready". The album was certified gold on July 22, 1991.

Track listing

Chart positions

References

External links
 

1990 albums
Albums produced by Gerald Levert
Atlantic Records albums
LeVert albums